Piper, in comics, may refer to:

Piper (Morlock), a member of Marvel Comics' Morlocks
Piper (Mutate), a member of Marvel Comics' Savage Land Mutates
Pied Piper (comics), a DC Comics character known as Piper

See also
Piper (disambiguation)